In Scientology, an implant is a form of thought insertion, similar to an engram but done deliberately and with evil intent.  It is "an intentional installation of fixed ideas, contra-survival to the thetan".

The intention in the original engram or incident is to implant an idea or emotion or sensation, regarding some phenomenon etc. The intention in Scientology and Dianetics is to erase the compulsive or command effect of the idea, emotion, sensation, etc. so that the person can make a rational judgment and decision in the affected areas of life.

Scientology practices often have to do with addressing implants prior to the current lifetime — one of the most notable is the R6 implant; but in some cases current life implants are addressed. Examples of implants according to Scientology include Aversion therapy, Electroconvulsive therapy, hypnosis, various attempts at brainwashing, and the inducing of fear or terror. Note that this is not a complete list, as many kinds of incidents can include implants as an element.

Other important implants in Scientology doctrine include the Helatrobus implants, which Hubbard claimed occurred 382 trillion years ago to 52 trillion years ago by an alien nation called the Helatrobans, who sought to restrain human minds by capturing and brainwashing thetans. These implants are said to be responsible for the concept of Heaven.

See also

 Space opera in Scientology scripture
 Galactic Confederacy
 Marcab Confederacy
 Helatrobus
 Incident (Scientology)
 Xenu

References

Lectures by Hubbard
"The Helatrobus Implants", 21 May 1963
"State of OT", 23 May 1963
"Assists" lecture. 3 October 1968, #10 in the Class VIII series. (Audio extracts - )
Saint Hill Special Briefing Courses, tapes 266, 268 and 272, 1963

Hubbard Communications Office Bulletins
 "Aircraft Door Goals", HCOB April 17, 1963
"Heaven", HCOB May 11, 1963 (no longer published by the Church of Scientology)
"Routine 3N: Line Plots", HCOB 14 July 1963
"Routine 3N - The Train GPMs - The Marcab Between Lives Implants", HCOB 24 August 1963

Notes 

Scientology beliefs and practices